Tarikere is a taluk in the Chikkamagaluru district in the state of Karnataka of India. The headquarters of the taluk is a town of the same name. It is popularly known as gateway of Malnad because the Malnad area starts from here. The town's name is derived from the number of water tanks which surround it (kere is the word for a large water tank).

Getting there

Road
National Highway NH-69 (Previously known as NH 206) (Bengaluru to Honnavar) passes through Tarikere.

From Mysore it can be reached via Mysore - Arsikere then NH-69.

From the district headquarters of Chikkamagaluru, Tarikere can be reached in 2 different ways. It can be reached via Lingadahalli, or via Kadur & Birur.

Rail
Tarikere lies on the Birur to Talguppa railway line. There are trains from Chikkamagalur, Mysuru and Bengaluru which stop at Tarikere on the way to Shimoga.

Air
There are no airports in the near vicinity. People traveling via airplane have to make use of the Mangaluru, Hubballi, or Bengaluru airports and choose an alternate means of transport to reach Tarikere.
The nearest International airport is Mangalore which is about 210kms, via Agumbe ghat road.

Geography
It has an average elevation of 698 metres (2290 feet).

Tarikere borders three taluks in its own district. There is Channagiri taluk to the north, Narasimharajapura to the west, Chikkamagaluru to the south-west, and Kadur to the south. Shimoga and Bhadravathi border Tarikere to the North and are in the Shimoga District. The following are the  headquarters which include both Malnad and Maidan  within Tarikere taluk:
 Amruthapura
 Lakkavalli
 Lingadahalli
 Kasaba

Demographics
 India census, Tarikere had a population of about 35,000. Males constitute 51% of the population and females constitute 49%. Tarikere has an average literacy rate of 68%, 8.5% higher than the national average of 59.5%: male literacy levels are at 73%, and female literacy levels are at 62%. In Tarikere, 11% of the population is under 6 years of age.

Economy
Agriculture is the primary occupation in Tarikere. Betel nuts, Paddy, Ragi, Areca nuts, Coffee, Coconuts, Bananas, Pan leaves, Mangoes, and Corn are the major types of crops grown in this region.
The region used to be a major rice-producing area though now predominantly grows areca nut. Vigyan Industries, a subsidiary of BEML, is present near Tarikere and is a major producer of steel castings.

Nearby places

Tarikere is surrounded by many tanks and ponds. The tanks near Tarikere include Chikkere, Doddakere, Dalavikere, Ramanayakanakere, and Kendarahalla. There are also several historical places surrounding Tarikere.
 Bhadra Wildlife Sanctuary is a wildlife sanctuary as well as a tiger protection area.
 Kemmangundi is a popular hill station in Tarikere.
 Amritheshwara temple is a temple in Amrithapura.
 Amritheshwara temple was constructed by the Hoysalas.
 The Kallathigiri falls are a popular series of miniature waterfalls which run under the Lord Veera Bhadra temple. 
 Bhadra Dam one of the oldest and biggest dam of Karnataka surrounded by lofty hills of western ghats which adds scenic beauty to it.
 Sri Subrahmanya Swamy temple is also one of the popular Hindu temples located in the heart of the town.
 Subramanya Temple is situated in the MG Road of Tarikere.  
 sri Banashankari devi temple  is situated in the   Galihalli cross  chikkamaglore road, tarikere,
 sri Parmanugatte Anjeneya Swamy templeis also one of the popular Hindu temples located in the of the town. 
 sri Parmanugatte Anjeneya Swamy  is situated in the Galihalli cross  tarikere,

Other information
Tarikere is immortalised in the popular Kannada tongue-twister folksong "Tarikere Eri Mele Mooru Kari Kuri Mari Meythittu".  This was also the title for a song in the film Devara Duddu and was sung by the famous singer, S P Balasubramanyam.

See also
A. Rangapura

References

External links
The Amriteshwara Temple by Dr. Jyotsna Kamat

Cities and towns in Chikkamagaluru district